The 2009 Pacific hurricane season officially started on May 15 in the East Pacific Ocean, and on June 1 in the Central Pacific; they both ended on November 30. These dates conventionally delimit the period of each year when most tropical cyclones form in the Pacific basin. No tropical cyclones formed during the month of May, making 2009 the first time that no tropical cyclones formed during May since 1999. The first tropical cyclone of the year, Tropical Depression One-E, formed June 18, and dissipated the following day. The first named storm of the season, Hurricane Andres formed on June 21. The final storm of the season, Neki, dissipaed on October 27.

This timeline documents all the storm formations, strengthening, weakening, landfalls, extratropical transitions, as well as dissipation.For convenience and clarity, in the timeline below, all landfalls are bolded. The timeline will also include information, when it becomes available, which was not operationally released, meaning that information from post-storm reviews by the National Hurricane Center, such as information on a storm that was not operationally warned on, have been included.

The graphical bar below gives a brief overview of storm activity during the season, and for convenience, the storm's maximum intensity is included as a color bar.

Timeline of events

May 
May 15
 The 2009 Eastern Pacific hurricane season officially begins.

June 
June 1

 The 2009 Central Pacific hurricane season officially begins.

June 18

June 19
 1800 UTC (11:00 pm PDT) – Tropical Depression One-E degenerates into a trough of low pressure near the Mexican coastline.

June 21
 1800 UTC (5:00 pm PDT) – Tropical Depression Two-E strengthens into Tropical Storm Andres.

June 23

June 24
 0000 UTC (5:00 am PDT) – Hurricane Andres weakens to a tropical storm.
 1200 UTC (5:00 pm PDT) – Tropical Storm Andres weakens to a tropical depression.
 1800 UTC (11:00 pm PDT) – Tropical Depression Andres is downgraded to a trough of low pressure shortly before dissipating.

July 

July 6
 1200 UTC (5:00 am PDT) – The tropical Depression is upgraded to Tropical Storm Blanca.

July 8
 1200 UTC (5:00 am PDT) – Tropical Storm Blanca weakens back to a tropical depression.

July 9

July 10
 1800 UTC (11:00 am PDT) – Tropical Depression Four-E strengthens into Tropical Storm Carlos.

July 11
 1800 UTC (11:00 am PDT) – Tropical Storm Carlos strengthens into Hurricane Carlos.

July 13
 0000 UTC (5:00 pm PDT July 12) – Hurricane Carlos weakens to a tropical storm.

July 14
 1200 UTC (5:00 am PDT) – Tropical Storm Carlos re-strengthens back into a Category 1 hurricane.

July 15
 0000 UTC (5:00 pm PDT July 14) – Hurricane Carlos reaches Category 2 intensity.
 1200 UTC (5:00 am PDT) – Tropical Depression Five-E strengthens into Tropical Storm Dolores.
 1800 UTC (11:00 am PDT) – Hurricane Carlos is downgraded to a tropical storm.

July 16
 0600 UTC (11:00 pm PDT July 15) – Tropical Storm Carlos weakens to a tropical depression.
 1800 UTC (11:00 am PDT) – Tropical Storm Dolores degenerates into a remnant low.

July 17
 0000 UTC (5:00 pm PDT July 16) – Tropical Depression Carlos dissipates.

July 30

August 
August 2
 1800 UTC (8:00 am HST) – Tropical Storm Lana weakens to a tropical depression.

August 3
 0000 UTC (2:00 pm HST August 2) – Tropical Depression Lana degenerates into a remnant low.
 1800 UTC (11:00 am PDT) – Tropical Depression Eight-E forms.

August 4
 0000 UTC (5:00 pm August 3 PDT) – Tropical Depression Seven-E strengthens into Tropical Storm Enrique.
 1800 UTC (11:00 am PDT) – Tropical Storm Felicia is upgraded to Hurricane Felicia.

August 5
 0600 UTC (11:00 pm PDT August 4) – Hurricane Felicia reaches Category 2 intensity.
 1200 UTC (5:00 am PDT) – Hurricane Felicia strengthens to a Category 3 major hurricane and becomes the first major hurricane of the 2009 Pacific hurricane season.
 1800 UTC (11:00 am PDT) – Hurricane Felicia strengthens to a Category 4 hurricane.

August 7
 0600 UTC (11:00 pm PDT August 6) – Hurricane Felicia weakens to a Category 3 hurricane.
 1800 UTC (11:00 am PDT) – Hurricane Felicia weakens to a Category 2 hurricane.

August 8
 0000 UTC (5:00 pm PDT August 7) – Tropical Depression Enrique degenerates into a remnant low.
 1200 UTC (2:00 am HST) – Hurricane Felicia weakens to a Category 1 hurricane and enters the Central Pacific Hurricane Center's area of responsibility.

August 9

August 11
 0300 UTC (5:00 pm August 10 HST) – Tropical Depression One-C forms south-southwest of Johnston Island.
 1500 UTC (5:00 am HST) – Tropical Depression One-C strengthens into Tropical Storm Maka.
 2100 UTC (11:00 am HST) – Tropical Depression Felicia degenerates to a remnant low.

August 12

August 13
 0000 UTC (5:00 pm PDT August 12) – Tropical Depression Ten-E strengthens into Tropical Storm Guillermo.

August 14
 0600 UTC (11:00 pm PDT August 13) – Tropical Storm Guillermo is upgraded to Hurricane Guillermo.
 1800 UTC (11:00 am PDT) – Hurricane Guillermo reaches Category 2 intensity.

August 15
 0600 UTC (11:00 pm PDT August 14) – Hurricane Guillermo reaches Category 3 intensity

August 16
 0000 UTC (5:00 pm PDT August 15) – Hurricane Guillermo weakens to a Category 2 hurricane.
 1800 UTC (11:00 am PDT) – Hurricane Guillermo weakens to a Category 1 hurricane.

August 17
 0000 UTC (2:00 pm HST August 16) – Hurricane Guillermo crosses the Central Pacific Hurricane Center's area of responsibility.

August 19

August 22
 1800 UTC (11:00 am PDT) – Tropical Depression Eleven-E strengthens into Tropical Storm Hilda.

August 23
 1200 UTC (2:00 am HST) – Tropical Storm Hilda crosses into the Central Pacific Hurricane Center's area of responsibility.

August 24
 1800 UTC (11:00 am PDT) – Tropical Depression Twelve-E forms  from the southern tip of Baja California.

August 25
 0000 UTC (8:00 pm PDT August 24) – Tropical Depression Twelve-E is upgraded to Tropical Storm Ignacio.

August 27
 0600 UTC (11:00 pm PDT August 26) – Tropical Storm Ignacio weakens to a tropical depression.
 1200 UTC (5:00 am PDT) – Tropical Depression Ignacio degenerates into a remnant low.

August 28
 1800 UTC (8:00 am HST) – Tropical Depression Hilda degenerates into a remnant low.

August 29
 0300 UTC (8:00 pm PDT August 28) – The NHC upgrades a broad area of low pressure off the southwest coast of Mexico to Tropical Depression Thirteen-E.
 0300 UTC (5:00 pm HST August 28) – The CPHC initiates advisories on Tropical Depression Two-C, the second system to form in the Central Pacific in 2009, 1370 miles west-southwest of Kauai.
 0900 UTC (2:00 am PDT) – Tropical Depression Thirteen-E strengthens into Tropical Storm Jimena.
 1500 UTC (8:00 am PDT) – The NHC upgrades Tropical Storm Jimena to a Category 1 hurricane.
 1500 UTC (8:00 am PDT) – The NHC upgrades a broad area of low pressure out in the open Pacific to Tropical Depression Fourteen-E.
 2100 UTC (2:00 pm PDT) – The NHC upgrades Hurricane Jimena to a Category 2 hurricane.
 2100 UTC (2:00 pm PDT) – Tropical Depression Fourteen-E strengthens into Tropical Storm Kevin.

August 30
 0900 UTC (2:00 am PDT) – The NHC upgrades Hurricane Jimena to a Category 3 hurricane.
 1500 UTC (8:00 am PDT) – The NHC upgrades Hurricane Jimena to a Category 4 hurricane.

August 31
 1500 UTC (8:00 am PDT) – Tropical Storm Kevin weakens into a tropical depression.

September 
September 1
 2100 UTC (2:00 pm PDT) – The NHC issues its last advisory on Tropical Depression Kevin.

September 2
 ca.1900 UTC (12 p.m. PDT) – Hurricane Jimena makes landfall between Puerto San Andresito and San Juanico with  winds.

September 3
 0300 UTC (8 p.m. PDT September 2) – Hurricane Jimena weakens to a tropical storm.

September 4
 0900 UTC (2 a.m. PDT) – Tropical Storm Jimena weakens into a tropical depression.
 2100 UTC (2 p.m. PDT) – The NHC issues its last advisory on Tropical Depression Jimena.

September 7
 0900 UTC (2 a.m. PDT) – The NHC initiates advisories on Tropical Depression Fifteen-E.
 2100 UTC (2 p.m. PDT) – Tropical Depression Fifteen-E strengthens into Tropical Storm Linda.

September 10
 0300 UTC (8 p.m. PDT September 9) – Tropical Storm Linda strengthens to a Category 1 hurricane.

September 10
 2100 UTC (8 p.m. PDT) – Hurricane Linda weakens to a tropical storm.

September 11
 2100 UTC (8 p.m. PDT) – Tropical Storm Linda weakens to a tropical depression, becoming a remnant low at the same time.

September 16
 1130 UTC (4:30 am PDT) – The NHC initiates advisories on Tropical Depression Sixteen-E.
 1500 UTC (8 a.m. PDT) – Tropical Depresion Sixteen-E strengthens into Tropical Storm Marty.

September 19
 0900 UTC (2 a.m. PDT) – Tropical Storm Marty weakens to a tropical depression.
 2100 UTC (2 p.m. PDT) – Tropical Depression Marty weakens to a remnant low.

September 23
 0300 UTC (8 p.m. PDT September 22) – Tropical Depression Seventeen-E forms south-southwest of Baja California.
 0900 UTC (2 a.m. PDT September 23) – Tropical Depression Seventeen-E strengthens into Tropical Storm Nora.

September 25
 0300 UTC (8 p.m. PDT September 24) – Tropical Storm Nora weakens to a tropical depression.
 0900 UTC (2 a.m. PDT) – Tropical Depression Nora becomes a remnant low.

October 
October 1
 1500 UTC (8 a.m. PDT) – The NHC initiates advisories on Tropical Depression Eighteen-E.
 2100 UTC (2 p.m. PDT) – Tropical Depresion Eighteen-E strengthens into Tropical Storm Olaf.

October 3
 0900 UTC (2 a.m. PDT) – Tropical Storm Olaf weakens to a tropical depression.

October 4
 0300 UTC (8 p.m. PDT October 3) – Tropical Depression Olaf becomes a remnant low.

October 11
 2100 UTC (2 p.m. PDT) – The NHC initiates advisories on Tropical Depression Nineteen-E.

October 12
 0300 UTC (8 p.m. PDT October 11) – Tropical Depression Nineteen-E strengthens into Tropical Storm Patricia.

October 14
 0600 UTC (11 p.m. PDT October 13) – Tropical Storm Patricia weakens to a tropical depression.
 0900 UTC (2 a.m. PDT) – Tropical Depression Patricia degenerates into a remnant low.

October 15
 2100 UTC (2 p.m. PDT) – The NHC initiates advisories on Tropical Depression Twenty-E.

October 16
 0300 UTC (8 p.m. PDT October 15) – Tropical Depression Twenty-E strengthens into Tropical Storm Rick.
 1500 UTC (8 a.m. PDT) – Tropical Storm Rick strengthens into a Category 1 hurricane.

October 17
 0300 UTC (8 p.m. PDT October 16) – Hurricane Rick strengthens into a Category 2 hurricane.
 0900 UTC (2 a.m. PDT) – Hurricane Rick strengthens into a Category 3 hurricane.
 0937 UTC (2:37 am PDT) – Hurricane Rick rapidly strengthens into a Category 4 hurricane.
 2210 UTC (3:10 pm PDT) – Hurricane Rick strengthens into a Category 5 hurricane, the first in the eastern Pacific since Hurricane Kenna in 2002.

October 18
 0300 UTC (8 p.m. PDT October 17) – Hurricane Rick becomes the second strongest hurricane ever recorded in the eastern Pacific with 180 mph (285 km/h) winds.
 2100 UTC (11 a.m. HST) – Tropical Depression Three-C forms 905 miles (1455 km) south-southeast of Honolulu.

October 19
 0300 UTC (8 p.m. PDT October 18) – Hurricane Rick weakens to a Category 4 hurricane.
 0900 UTC (2 a.m. PDT) – Hurricane Rick weakens to a Category 3 hurricane.
 1500 UTC (5 a.m. HST) – Tropical Depression Three-C strengthens into Tropical Storm Neki.
 1800 UTC (11 a.m. PDT) – Hurricane Rick weakens to a Category 2 hurricane.

October 20
 0000 UTC (5 p.m. PDT October 19) – Hurricane Rick weakens to a Category 1 hurricane.
 0300 UTC (8 p.m. PDT October 19) – Hurricane Rick weakens to a tropical storm.

October 21
 0000 UTC (2 p.m. HST October 20) – Tropical Storm Neki strengthens into a Category 1 hurricane.
 ca.1400 UTC (7 a.m. PDT) – Tropical Storm Rick makes landfall near Mazatlán with  winds.
 1500 UTC (5 a.m. HST) – Hurricane Neki strengthens into a Category 2 hurricane.
 1500 UTC (11 a.m. PDT) – Tropical Storm Rick weakens to a tropical depression.
 2100 UTC (2 p.m. PDT) – Tropical Depression Rick weakens to a remnant low and the NHC issues their last advisory.
 2100 UTC (11 a.m. HST) – Hurricane Neki strengthens into a Category 3 hurricane.

October 23
 1500 UTC (5 a.m. HST) – Hurricane Neki weakens to a tropical storm.

November 
November 30
 The 2009 Pacific hurricane season officially ends.

See also 

 2009 Pacific hurricane season
 Pacific hurricane season
 Timeline of the 2009 Atlantic hurricane season

References

External links 
 2009 Central Pacific Tropical Cyclone Reports
 2009 Eastern Pacific Tropical Cyclone Reports
 2009 Tropical Cyclone Advisory Archive (Atlantic, Eastern Pacific and Central Pacific)

Pacific hurricane meteorological timelines
2009 EPac T